The European Parliament of Enterprises (EPE) is an event for European corporations, organized by Eurochambres, the Association of European Chambers of Commerce and Industry, once every two years. The first edition of the event was launched on 14 October 2008 on the occasion of Eurochambres' fiftieth anniversary.

Concept
The concept of the European Parliament of Enterprises originated from the consideration, that there is a democratic gap between the European institutions and the main actors of economic growth, entrepreneurs and that, consequently, European legislators do not sufficiently take into account entrepreneurs' concerns. 
On the other hand, businesses are largely unfamiliar with the role and functioning of the European Union and the significance that the institutions’ decisions can have on their activities and results.

Participants
751 entrepreneurs, or Members of the European Parliament of Enterprises (MEPEs), gather in the symbolic location of the Hemicycle of the European Parliament. The composition of the EPE reflects the number of Members of the European Parliament per member state.

Aims and objectives
The EPE aims to bring businesses and institutions face-to-face for one day so as to enhance mutual understanding. The EPE represents a unique opportunity for businesses to have a direct debate with high European representatives and to provide them with a direct bottom-up feedback on EU policy related issues.

Votes
During the EPE, Members of the European Parliament of Enterprises exercise their voting rights on major EU business-related issues.
The results of the votes are presented by Eurochambres to the relevant political interlocutors from all of the EU institutions as "the voice of European businesses”.
The "European Parliament of Enterprises” is organised with the active cooperation of Eurochambres' members, the national associations of Chambers of Commerce & Industry.

References
On one of the resolution adopted by the EPE related to the European patent system - Europolitics (25/03/2009) .
French Presidency of the Council of the EU (14/10/2008) - The first European Parliament of Enterprises .

Specific

External links
EPE Official website
 Eurochambres' website

Business organizations based in Europe
Business conferences
Economy of Europe
2008 establishments in Europe